Bryotropha branella is a moth of the family Gelechiidae. It is found in the north-eastern part of the United States and adjoining south-eastern Canada.

The wingspan is 11–13 mm. The forewings are ochreous to dark ochreous grey with a fuscous costal edge and with distinct blackish basal spots at the costa and tornus. The hindwings are pale ochreous grey, but darker towards the apex. Adults have been recorded on wing from late June to mid August and in mid-September. There is probably one generation per year.

References

Moths described in 1908
branella
Moths of North America